The Macaronesian Biogeographic Region is a biogeographic region, as defined by the European Environment Agency, that covers the Azores, the Canary Islands, and Madeira.
The name comes from the group of four archipelagos collectively known as Macaronesia that also include Cape Verde, which is not included in the European region.

Extent
The Macaronesian Biogeographic Region includes the Portuguese archipelagos of the Azores and Madeira, and the Spanish Canary Islands.

The Natura 2000 list of sites of Community importance for the region was the first such list to be adopted, in December 2001. 
The list is updated every year.

Environment
The archipelagos all have a volcanic origin, complex landscape and gentle climate, and have rich biodiversity.

Notes

Sources

 
 

Environment of the Canary Islands
Environment of the Azores
Environment of Madeira
Biogeography